Boros is a surname. It is sometimes spelled with diacritics on the final "s", as in Boroš or Boroș. Notable people with the surname include:

Boros 
Adalbert Boros (1908–2003), Romanian Roman Catholic archbishop and political prisoner
Attila Boros (born ?), Hungarian canoer
Christian Boros (born 1964), German advertising agency founder and art collector
Csongor Boros (born 1997), Serbian-born Hungarian footballer
Eddie Boros (1934–2007), American artist
Endre Boros (born 1953), Hungarian-American mathematician, professor, and editor
Ferike Boros (1880–1951), Hungarian-born American actress
Gábor Boros (born 1997), Hungarian footballer
Gergely Boros (born ?), Hungarian canoer
Guy Boros (born 1964), American golfer; son of Julius Boros
Imre Boros (born 1947), Hungarian economist and politician
István Boros ( early 1930s), Hungarian table tennis player
Julius Boros (1920–1994), American golfer; father of Guy Boros
Katalin Boros (born 1941), Hungarian swimmer and Olympics competitor
László Boros (born 1982), Hungarian high jumper and Olympics competitor
Ottó Boros (1929–1988), Hungarian water polo player and Olympic medalist
Péter Boros (1908–1976), Hungarian gymnast and Olympics competitor
Sándor Boros (born 1949), Hungarian javelin thrower, Olympics competitor, and coach
Steve Boros (1936–2010), American baseball player, coach, manager, scout, and administrator
Zoltán Boros (born 1948), Hungarian orienteering competitor

Boroš 
Jaroslav Boroš (born 1947), Slovak footballer
Michael Boroš (born 1992), Czech cyclist
Peter Boroš (born 1980), Slovak footballer
Tamara Boroš (born 1977), Hungarian-Croatian table tennis player

Boroș 
Aurel Boroș (1922–?), Romanian footballer
Iosif Boroș (born 1953), Romanian handball player and Olympic medalist